Christopher "Kick" Gurry (born 25 May 1978) is an Australian actor.

Gurry was born in Melbourne, Australia. He got his nickname when his brother could not say Christopher so he said "Kicker". When he got into high school, he shortened it to "Kick". He studied at Wesley College, Melbourne, and has featured in films including Looking for Alibrandi (1999), Garage Days (2002), Speed Racer (2008) and Edge of Tomorrow (2014).

Filmography

References

External links

1978 births
Australian male film actors
Australian male television actors
Living people
People educated at Wesley College (Victoria)
Male actors from Melbourne
21st-century Australian male actors
20th-century Australian male actors